Computable Document Format (CDF) is an electronic document format designed to allow authoring dynamically generated, interactive content. CDF was created by Wolfram Research, and CDF files can be created using Mathematica. As of 2021, the Wolfram Research website lists CDF as a "legacy" format.

Features
Computable Document Format supports GUI elements such as sliders, menus, and buttons. Content is updated using embedded computation in response to GUI interaction. Contents can include formatted text, tables, images, sounds, and animations. CDF supports Mathematica typesetting and technical notation. Paginated layout, structured drill down layout, and slideshow mode are supported. Styles can be controlled using a cascading style sheet.

Reading
CDF files can be read using a proprietary CDF Player, downloadable from the Wolfram Research website but with a restricted license. In contrast to static formats such as PDF, the CDF Player contains an entire runtime library of Mathematica allowing document content to be generated in response to user interaction and digital textbooks.

CDF reader support is available for Microsoft Windows, Macintosh, Linux and iOS but not for e-book readers or Android tablets. The reader supports a plugin mode for Internet Explorer, Mozilla Firefox, Google Chrome, Opera and Safari, which allows CDF content to be embedded inline in HTML pages.

Uses
Computable Document Format has been used in electronic books by Pearson Education, specifically MyMathLab, to provide the content for the Wolfram Demonstrations Project, and to add client-side interactivity to Wolfram Alpha.

See also 
 List of numerical analysis software
 Comparison of numerical analysis software

References 

 

Computer-related introductions in 2011
Wolfram Research
Electronic documents
Open formats
Page description languages
Vector graphics
Computer file formats
Digital press